A New Voyage to Carolina is a 1709 book by the English explorer and naturalist John Lawson. It is considered one of colonial America's most comprehensive accounts of Native American civilization. Lawson arrived in Charleston, and proceeded to trek through the back country and Upstate South Carolina, and on to New Bern and Virginia. The expedition lasted from 1700 to 1701, but the book was published only after Lawson served as the king's surveyor for the region. The books subtitle is " Containing the Exact Description and Natural History of that Country: Together with the Present State thereof. And a Journal of a Thousand miles travel'd thro' several Nations of Indians. Giving a particular Account of their Customs, Manners, &c." The book was reprinted in the next decade as "The History of Carolina". Lawson was subsequently caught, tortured, and executed by the Tuscarora people, a tribe documented in the book, during a period of resistance to colonial depredation.

References

External links
 

1709 books